Olenegorsk Radar Station (also described as Olenegorsk-1 or Murmansk) is the site of a Soviet and Russian early warning radar. It is located near Olenegorsk on the Kola Peninsula, north of the Arctic Circle in north west Russia. It is considered to be a key part of the Russian early warning system against ballistic missile attack, and provides coverage of ballistic missile launches in the Norwegian Sea and North Sea. The station is operated by the Russian Aerospace Defence Forces.

The military town for the station is called Olenegorsk-1 and is at the village of Protoki.

Radar
Olenegorsk was the site of one of the first two early warning radars in the Soviet Union, the other being at Skrunda-1. The Dnestr-M radar (NATO codename: "Hen House") was started in 1963 and completed in 1969, entering service in 1971.

A Daugava radar (NATO codename:"Pechora") was later built next to it. This is a prototype Daryal receiver, a phased array receiver which worked with the Dnestr acting as a transmitter. The Daugava, which is still operational, was implemented in Olenegorsk to minimise interference caused by the Northern Lights.

Voronezh
It is planned to replace the Dnestr-M/Daugava radars at Olenegorsk with the new generation of Russian early warning radar systems, the Voronezh radar. According to news reports a new Voronezh radar will start construction in 2017, replacing both existing radars.

References

External links
Photo of the radars – Daugava left, Dnepr right

Russian Space Forces
Russian and Soviet military radars
Military installations of Russia
Military installations of the Soviet Union
Murmansk Oblast